Candy Rain is the debut studio album from American R&B group Soul for Real, released March 28, 1995 on Uptown Records and distributed through MCA Records.

The album peaked at number twenty-three on the Billboard 200 chart. By August 1995 it was certified platinum in sales by the RIAA after sales exceeding one million copies in the United States.

Release and reception
Candy Rain peaked at twenty-three on the United States Billboard 200 and number five on the R&B Albums chart. The album was certified platinum by August 1995.

While Stephen Thomas Erlewine of Allmusic did call the group "undoubtedly fine singers," he didn't feel they were strong enough to make some of the weaker material on the album very convincing.

Track listing

Chart history

Weekly charts

Year-end charts

Singles

"—" denotes releases that did not chart.

Personnel
Information taken from Allmusic.
arranging – Heavy D, Terri Robinson
art direction – Brett Wright
assistant engineering – Ben Arindell, Chris Curran, Steve Sisco, Matt Tuffli
assistant mixing – Steve Sisco, Matt Tuffli
bass – Terri Robinson
composing – Pete Belasco
drum programming – Poke
engineering – Bill Esses, Mikael Ifuersen, Richard Travali
executive production – Andre Harrell, Heavy D
guitar – James E. Rohlehr
keyboards – Dave Cintron, Alexander Richbourg
loops – Poke
make-up – Melanie Harris
mastering – Michael Sarsfield
mixing – Bill Esses, Tony Maserati, Richard Travali
photography – Mark Contratto
production – Heavy D, Poke, Red Hot Lover Tone
production coordination – Debra Young
saxophone – Sylvester Scott
vocal arrangement – Kenny Greene
vocals – Andre Dalyrimple, Brian Dalyrimple, Christopher Dalyrimple, Jason Dalyrimple, Terri Robinson
vocals (background) – Desiree Dalyrimple, Nicole Dalyrimple, Kenny Greene, Red Hot Lover Tone, Terri Robinson
vocoder – Dave Cintron, Darin Whittington

Notes

External links
 
 Candy Rain at Discogs

1995 debut albums
MCA Records albums
Soul for Real albums
Uptown Records albums